Sophia of Hanover (born Princess Sophia of the Palatinate; 14 October 1630 – 8 June 1714) was the Electress of Hanover by marriage to Elector Ernest Augustus and later the heiress presumptive to the thrones of England and Scotland (later Great Britain) and Ireland under the Act of Settlement 1701, as a granddaughter of James VI and I. Princess Sophia died less than two months before she would have become Queen of Great Britain and Ireland. Consequently, her son (and grandson of Elizabeth Stuart, Queen of Bohemia) George I, succeeded her first cousin once removed, Queen Anne, to the British throne, and the succession to the throne has since been defined as, and composed entirely of, her legitimate and Protestant descendants.

Sophia was born in 1630 to Frederick V of the Palatinate, a member of the House of Wittelsbach, and Elizabeth Stuart, daughter of King  James VI and I. She grew up in the Dutch Republic, where her family had sought refuge after the sequestration of their Electorate during the Thirty Years' War. Sophia's brother Charles Louis was restored to the Lower Palatinate as part of the Peace of Westphalia. Sophia married Ernest Augustus of Brunswick-Lüneburg in 1658. Despite his temper and frequent absences, Sophia loved him, and bore him seven children who survived to adulthood. Born a landless cadet, Ernest Augustus succeeded in having the House of Hanover raised to electoral dignity in 1692. As a result, Sophia became Electress of Hanover, the title by which she is best remembered. A patron of the arts, Sophia commissioned Herrenhausen Palace and its gardens and sponsored philosophers, such as Gottfried Leibniz and John Toland.

Early life 

The twelfth child of Frederick V of the Palatinate and Elizabeth Stuart, also known as the "Winter King and Queen of Bohemia" for their short rule in that country, Sophia was born in The Wassenaer Hof, The Hague, Dutch Republic, where her parents had fled into exile after the Battle of White Mountain. Through her mother, she was the granddaughter of James VI and I, king of Scotland and England in a personal union. At birth, Sophia was granted an annuity of 40 thalers by the Estates of Friesland. Sophia was courted by her first cousin, Charles II of England, but she rebuffed his advances as she thought he was using her in order to get money from her mother's supporter, Lord William Craven.

Marriage 

Before her marriage, Sophia, as the daughter of Frederick V, Elector Palatine of the Rhine, was referred to as Sophie, Princess Palatine of the Rhine, or as Sophia of the Palatinate. The Electors of the Palatinate were the Calvinist senior branch of House of Wittelsbach, whose Catholic branch ruled the Electorate of Bavaria.

On 30 September 1658, she married Ernest Augustus, Duke of Brunswick-Lüneburg, at Heidelberg, who in 1692 became the first Elector of Hanover. Ernest Augustus was a second cousin of Sophia's mother Elizabeth Stuart, Queen of Bohemia, as they were both great-grandchildren of Christian III of Denmark.

Sophia became a friend and admirer of Gottfried Leibniz while he was librarian at the Court of Hanover. Their friendship lasted from 1676 until her death in 1714. This friendship resulted in a substantial correspondence, first published in the 19th century (Klopp 1973), that reveals Sophia to have been a woman of exceptional intellectual ability and curiosity. She was well-read in the works of René Descartes and Baruch Spinoza. Together with Ernest Augustus she greatly improved the Herrenhausen Palace, and she was the guiding spirit in the creation of the Herrenhausen Gardens surrounding the palace, where she died.

Issue 
Sophia had seven children who reached adulthood:

 George I of Great Britain (1660–1727)
Frederick Augustus (1661–1690), Imperial General
 Maximilian William of Brunswick-Lüneburg (1666–1726), field marshal in the Imperial Army
 Sophia Charlotte (1668–1705), Queen in Prussia
 Charles Philip of Brunswick-Lüneburg (1669–1690), colonel in the Imperial Army
 Christian Henry of Brunswick-Lüneburg (1671–1703)
 Ernest Augustus of Brunswick-Lüneburg, Duke of York and Albany (1674–1728), became prince-bishop of Osnabrück

Three of her sons were killed in battle.

Sophia was absent for almost a year, 1664–65, during a long holiday with Ernest Augustus in Italy. She corresponded regularly with her sons' governess and took a great interest in her sons' upbringing, even more so on her return. After Sophia's tour, she bore Ernest Augustus another four sons and a daughter. In her letters, Sophia describes her eldest son as a responsible, conscientious child who set an example to his younger brothers and sisters.

Sophia was, at first, against the marriage of her son George and Sophia Dorothea of Celle, looking down on Sophia Dorothea's mother (who was not of royal birth and to whom Sophia referred as "mouse dirt mixed among the pepper") and concerned by Sophia Dorothea's legitimated status, but was eventually won over by the financial advantages inherent in the marriage.

Heiress presumptive 
In September 1700, Sophia met her cousin King William III of England at Het Loo Palace in Apeldoorn, the Netherlands. This happened two months after the death of his nephew Prince William, Duke of Gloucester, son of the future Queen Anne. By this time, given the ailing William III's reluctance to remarry, the inclusion of Sophia in the line of succession was becoming more likely because she was a Protestant, as was her son. Her candidature was aided by the fact that she had grown up in the Netherlands close to William III and was able to converse fluently with him in Dutch, his native tongue.

A year after their meeting, the Parliament of England passed the Act of Settlement 1701, which declared that in the event of no legitimate issue from Anne or William III, the crowns of England and Ireland were to settle upon "the most excellent princess Sophia, electress and duchess-dowager of Hanover" and "the heirs of her body, being Protestant". Scotland being a separate state in international law at the time, this did not mean she would also succeed Anne as Queen of Scotland, which led to a succession crisis and eventually to the Treaty of Union between Scotland and England in 1706/07. 
The key excerpt from the Act, naming Sophia as heir presumptive, reads:

Sophia was made second in line to cut off a claim by the Roman Catholic James Francis Edward Stuart, who would have become James III and VIII and to deny the throne to the many other Roman Catholics and spouses of Roman Catholics who held a claim. The act restricts the British throne to the "Protestant heirs" of Sophia of Hanover who had never been Roman Catholic or married a Roman Catholic. Some British politicians attempted several times to bring Sophia to England in order to enable her to assume government immediately in the event of Anne's death. It was argued that such a course was necessary to ensure Sophia's succession, for Anne's Roman Catholic half-brother was significantly closer to London than was Sophia. The Electress was eager to move to London, but the proposal was denied, as such action would mortally offend Anne, who was strongly opposed to a rival court in her kingdom. Anne might have been aware that Sophia, who was active and lively despite her old age, could cut a better figure than herself. Sophia was completely uncertain of what would happen after Anne's death, saying: "What Parliament does one day, it undoes the next."

When the law was passed in mid-1701, Sophia at age 70, five of her children from ages 35 to 41, and three legitimate grandchildren from ages 14 to 18, were alive. Although Sophia was 35 years older than Anne, she was very fit and healthy, and invested time and energy in securing the succession either for herself or her son. There are more than 5,000 legitimate descendants of Sophia, although not all are in the line of succession. The Sophia Naturalization Act 1705 granted the right of British (or more correctly English, as Great Britain only came into existence in 1707) nationality to Sophia's non-Roman Catholic descendants; those who had obtained the right to British citizenship via this Act at any time before its repeal by the British Nationality Act 1948 retain this lawful right today.

Death and legacy 

Although considerably older than Queen Anne, Sophia enjoyed much better health. According to the Countess of Bückeburg in a letter to Sophia's niece, the Raugravine Luise, on 5 June 1714 Sophia felt ill after receiving an angry letter from Queen Anne. Three days later, on 8 June, she was walking in the gardens of Herrenhausen when she ran to shelter from a sudden downpour of rain and collapsed and died, aged 83—a very advanced age for the era. Queen Anne died less than two months later on 1 August 1714 at the age of 49. Had Sophia survived Anne, she would have been the oldest person to ascend the British throne.

Upon Sophia's death, her eldest son Elector George Louis of Brunswick-Lüneburg (1660–1727) became heir presumptive in her place and within two months succeeded Anne as George I of Great Britain. Sophia's daughter Sophia Charlotte of Hanover (1668–1705) married Frederick I of Prussia, from whom the later Prussian and German monarchs descend.

Sophia was buried in the chapel of Leine Palace in Hanover, as were her husband and their son George I. After the destruction of the palace and its chapel during World War II by Allied aerial raids, their remains were moved into the mausoleum of King Ernest Augustus I in the Berggarten of Herrenhausen Gardens in 1957.

Ancestry

Works 
 Memoirs of Sophia, Electress of Hanover 1630-1680, translated by H. Forester (London, 1888)

Notes

References 

 
 Israel, Johnathan I. Radical Enlightenment. Oxford University Press, 2001, 84.

Further reading 
 Duggan, J. N., Sophia of Hanover, From Winter Princess to Heiress of Great Britain; London, Peter Owen, 2010
 Klopp, Onno (ed.), Correspondance de Leibniz avec l'électrice Sophie. Hanover, 1864–1875
 Van der Cruysse, Dirk; Sophie de Hanovre, memoires et lettres de voyage; Paris, Fayard, 1990
 

|-

 
1630 births
1714 deaths
Princesses of the Palatinate
Nobility from The Hague
House of Palatinate-Simmern
House of Stuart
House of Hanover
Heirs to the English throne
Heirs to the British throne
Burials at Berggarten Mausoleum, Herrenhausen (Hanover)
Duchesses of Brunswick-Lüneburg
Electresses of Hanover
Bohemian princesses
17th-century Bohemian people
17th-century Bohemian women
18th-century Bohemian people
18th-century Bohemian women
18th-century British people
18th-century British women
17th-century English women
17th-century English people
English patrons of the arts
Czech patrons of the arts
Daughters of kings
Non-inheriting heirs presumptive